The 1989 Estonian SSR Football Championship was won by Zvezda.

League table

References

Estonian Football Championship
Est
Football
1989 in Estonian football